Bhitarwar Assembly constituency is one of the 230 Vidhan Sabha (Legislative Assembly) constituencies of Madhya Pradesh state in central India. This constituency came into existence in 2008, following the delimitation of the assembly constituencies. This constituency covers parts of the erstwhile Gird and Dabra constituencies.

Overview
Bhitarwar (constituency number 18) is one of the 6 Vidhan Sabha constituencies located in Gwalior district. This constituency covers the entire Bhitarwar tehsil and part of Gwalior tehsil of the district.

Bhitarwar is part of Gwalior Lok Sabha constituency along with seven other Vidhan Sabha segments, namely, Gwalior, Gwalior East, Gwalior South, Gwalior Rural and Dabra in this district and Karera and Pohari in Shivpuri district.

Members of Legislative Assembly

As a constituency of Madhya Pradesh

Election Results

2013 results

See also
 Bhitarwar

References

Gwalior district
Assembly constituencies of Madhya Pradesh